List of Congolese writers may refer to:

List of Democratic Republic of the Congo writers
List of Republic of the Congo writers